Henri Gashi (born 3 December 2001) is an English professional footballer currently playing as a midfielder for Besa Kavajë.

Club career
In 2019, Gashi moved from Bromley to Fisher. At some point, he moved back to Bromley, but was signed by Albanian side Besa Kavajë in February 2021.

Gashi made his senior debut on 27 March 2021 away to Elbasani in a 2–1 win and scored his first professional goal on 23 April 2021 against Tomori Berat in a 3–1 away loss.

Career statistics

Club
.

Notes

References

2001 births
Living people
Footballers from Greater London
English footballers
Association football midfielders
Kategoria e Parë players
Bromley F.C. players
Fisher F.C. players
KF Besa Kavajë players
English expatriate footballers
Expatriate footballers in Albania